This is the list of parks and gardens located in Estonia. The list is incomplete.

References 

Estonia
Estonia